APF football club is a Nepali association football club, that competes in the Martyr's Memorial A-Division League.

Football league 
At its first appearance in the Martyr's Memorial A-Division League of season 2005/6, the club finished the season in fifth position, behind MMC, Three Star, Tribhuvan Army Club, and the Nepal Police Club.

The club remained in fifth position in the 2006/7 season.

At the end of the 2009/10 season, the APF Club barely escaped relegation, staying in the league only by defeating Machchindra Club by 8–0 in the last match of the league. At the end of all 22 matches, APF is now in 10th position.

Current squad

References

Football clubs in Nepal